The WPA World Ten-ball Championship is a professional ten-ball pool tournament sanctioned by the World Pool-Billiard Association (WPA). The event was first held in 2008 in the Philippines, followed by playings there in 2009 and 2011. After not being contested for several years, it was resurrected in 2015 by boxer Manny Pacquiao, who successfully campaigned to the WPA for the championship to be moved from Metro Manila to General Santos. An event was announced in June 2018, but was postponed until relocating to the Las Vegas Valley in 2019. The scheduled 2020 championship was canceled due to the COVID-19 pandemic. The most recent playings have been held in the fall of 2021 and the spring of 2022.

History

In 2008 the World Ten-ball Championship was held, with prizes totaling US$400,000 (₱18,860,000), was held at the Philippine International Convention Center, Manila, September 29 through October 5, 2008. There were 128 players competing, representing 44 countries. Vice-President of the Philippines Noli de Castro made the ceremonial opening break shot, witnessed by officials of the WPA, International Olympic Committee, Philippine Sports Commission, Philippine Olympic Committee, Billiards and Snooker Congress of the Philippines, and tournament organizer Raya Sports.

In the final, England's Darren Appleton defeated Nineteen-year-old Wu Jia-qing, who was using a borrowed cue stick, winning $100,000. Appleton was also quoted as saying: "Pool is an easy choice for me as a sport as I have to choose among boxing, football and pool among others. But this victory is sweeter for me and I have to dedicate this to my parents, whose relationship is in the rocks. With the $100,000 grand prize, first, I have to give some to my parents, because we had a difficult way of living."

WPA president Ian Anderson would later announce: "This early, there's a strong clamor for the WTBC and it will definitely be back next year in Manila. It will be staged October of next year and there's also the Philippine Open to be held June 2009. I think Manila is the best place to go in hosting pool and it is living up to its billing as the pool Mecca in Asia." The event would later take place in 2009, being won by Finn Mika Immonen, and then again in 2011 by Dutchman Huidji See. A later event was reimagined by boxer Manny Pacquiao in 2015, with the event being won by Taipei's Ko Pin-yi.

On July 30, 2018, the WPA announced the return of the World Ten-ball Championship. The event was set to take place in the Philippines, but was later postponed. Taipei's Ko Ping-chung won the 2019 event, which took place in Las Vegas. The 2020 edition of the championship was postponed because of the COVID-19 pandemic. The 2021 edition was won by Albanian Eklent Kaçi, and the 2022 edition was won by Pole Wojciech Szewczyk.

Winners

The following is a list of Men's WPA World Ten-Ball Champions.

Top performers

 Active participants are shown in bold.
 In the event of identical records, players are sorted in alphabetical order by first name.

Women
The following is a list of Women's WPA World Ten-Ball Champions.

Mixed teams
The following is a list of Men's & Women's WPA World Mixed Teams Ten-Ball Champions.

References

 
World championships in pool
Recurring sporting events established in 2008